The following radio stations broadcast on FM frequency 100.9 MHz:

Argentina
 Activa in Vera, Santa Fe
 Comunal de Nelson in Nelson, Santa Fe
 LRS768 Contacto in Las Parejas, Santa Fe
 del Sol in Mendoza
 La Voz Rafaela in Rafaela, Santa Fe
 Metropolis in Villa María, Cordoba
 Nuevo Día in Santa Cruz
 Life in San Carlos de Bariloche, Bariloche
 Adrenalina in Corrientes
 Dinamo in Salta
 La Matera in Quilmes, Buenos Aires
 Urbana in San Francisco, Córdoba
 Laberinto in Las Toninas, Buenos Aires
 Frecuencia Río in Neuquén
 Libertad in Caleta Olivia, Santa Cruz
 Urbana in Frontera, Santa Fe
 Top Pilar in Pilar, Córdoba
 Mega in Tandil, Buenos Aires
 Provincia in Santiago del Estero
 Líder in San Martín, Buenos Aires

Australia
 CONNECT FM 100.9 in Bankstown, New South Wales
 2MRR in Gloucester, New South Wales
 6NME in Perth, Western Australia
 Port Stephens FM in Port Stephens
 Radio National in Bega, New South Wales
 Radio National in Bundaberg, Queensland
 SBS Radio in Darwin, Northern Territory
 7TTT in Hobart, Tasmania
 Vision Radio Network in Warrnambool, Victoria

Canada (Channel 265)
 CBAF-FM-8 in Weymouth, Nova Scotia
 CBJX-FM in Chicoutimi, Quebec
 CBLA-FM-3 in Wingham, Ontario
 CBQH-FM in Dryden, Ontario
 CBWK-FM in Thompson, Manitoba
 CHXX-FM in Donnacona, Quebec
 CIPM-FM in Peguis, Manitoba
 CIYM-FM in Brighton, Ontario
 CKAP-FM in Kapuskasing, Ontario
 CKHA-FM in Haliburton, Ontario
 CKTO-FM in Truro, Nova Scotia
 CKUA-FM-4 in Grande Prairie, Alberta
 CKUV-FM in High River/Okotoks, Alberta
 CKUY-FM in Maple Creek, Saskatchewan
 VF2048 in Stewart Crossing, Yukon

 VF2095 in David Inlet, Newfoundland and Labrador

 VF2573 in Brochet, Manitoba
 VF2586 in Gadsby, Alberta

China 
 CNR Music Radio in Harbin

Malaysia
 Bernama Radio in Kuching, Sarawak
 Buletin FM in Malacca and Northern Johor (Coming Soon)
 Minnal FM in Central Kelantan
 Selangor FM in Selangor
 Sinar in Langkawi, Kedah
 Zayan in Kota Bharu, Kelantan (Coming Soon)

Mexico
 XHCAA-FM in Aguascalientes, Aguascalientes
 XHCHE-FM in Chetumal, Quintana Roo
 XHDOM-FM in Iguala, Guerrero
 XHEJD-FM in Poza Rica, Veracruz
 XHERN-FM in Montemorelos, Nuevo León
 XHI-FM in Morelia, Michoacán
 XHKC-FM in Oaxaca, Oaxaca
 XHLAB-FM in Lagunas/Barrio de la Soledad, Oaxaca
 XHLO-FM in Chihuahua, Chihuahua
 XHMAJ-FM in Mariscala de Juárez, Oaxaca
 XHMTV-FM in Minatitlán, Veracruz
 XHONG-FM in Ojinaga, Chihuahua
 XHPALV-FM in Alto Lucero-Xalapa, Veracruz
 XHPAPM-FM in Apatzingán, Michoacán
 XHS-FM in Tampico, Tamaulipas
 XHSA-FM in Saltillo, Coahuila
 XHSBH-FM in Sabinas Hidalgo, Nuevo León
 XHSM-FM in Ciudad Obregón, Sonora
 XHSON-FM in Mexico City
 XHTBV-FM in Tierra Blanca, Veracruz
 XHVM-FM in Piedras Negras, Coahuila

United Kingdom
 Classic FM at Wrotham, Kent

United States (Channel 265)
  in Beaumont, California
  in Naknek, Alaska
  in Grandview, Washington
  in Grafton, North Dakota
 KAXZ-LP in Wichita, Kansas
 KAYO (FM) in Wasilla, Alaska
 KBAR-FM in Victoria, Texas
 KBOQ in Lima, Montana
 KBUG in Big Spring, Texas
  in Cordova, Alaska
 KCKP in Laurel, Missouri
 KCLY in Clay Center, Kansas
 KDEL-FM in Arkadelphia, Arkansas
 KDVW-LP in Montrose, Colorado
 KESA (FM) in Eureka Springs, Arkansas
  in Petersburg, Alaska
 KGBL in Lakin, Kansas
  in Miami, Oklahoma
  in Richwood, Louisiana
 KHMU in Buttonwillow, California
 KHMV-LP in Half Moon Bay, California
  in Salem, Arkansas
 KJXP-LP in Nacogdoches, Texas
 KKFJ-LP in Kailua-Kona, Hawaii
  in Tracy, California
 KNEC in Yuma, Colorado
 KNEY-LP in Kearney, Nebraska
 KNHP-LP in Corpus Christi, Texas
 KNMJ in Eunice, New Mexico
 KOWZ in Blooming Prairie, Minnesota
 KPEG-LP in Lompoc, California
 KQSR in Yuma, Arizona
  in Johannesburg, California
 KRFN in Sparks, Nevada
 KRRY in Canton, Missouri
 KSKR-FM in Sutherlin, Oregon
 KSMJ-LP in Edmond, Oklahoma
 KSXY in Forestville, California
 KTSO in Sapulpa, Oklahoma
 KVCB-LP in Vacaville, California
 KVMK in Wheelock, Texas
 KWFB (FM) in Holliday, Texas
 KWIA in Newell, Iowa
  in Russellville, Arkansas
 KWLP in Peach Springs, Arizona
 KWTN in Allen, Nebraska
 KXGL in Amarillo, Texas
 KXIN in Wagner, South Dakota
  in Sierra Vista, Arizona
 KZNM in Towaoc, Colorado
 WAAI in Hurlock, Maryland
 WAKB in Waynesboro, Georgia
  in Selma, Alabama
 WANY-FM in Albany, Kentucky
 WAYA-FM in Ridgeville, South Carolina
 WAYC in Bedford, Pennsylvania
 WBDC in Huntingburg, Indiana
 WBFY-LP in Belfast, Maine
  in Bryan, Ohio
  in Peru, Illinois
 WCID in Horseheads, New York
  in Sidney, New York
  in West Point, Georgia
  in Pine City, Minnesota
 WDYD-LP in Merrill, Wisconsin
 WEIO in Huntingdon, Tennessee
 WFFR-LP in Roosevelt Park, Michigan
 WFMI in Southern Shores, North Carolina
 WHHH in Speedway, Indiana
  in Hoopeston, Illinois
 WHSP-LP in Black Mountain, North Carolina
  in Elkin, North Carolina
 WIQO-FM in Forest, Virginia
  in Marianna, Florida
  in Mcconnelsville, Ohio
 WJES in Maysville, Georgia
 WJSR in Lakeside, Virginia
  in Utica, Mississippi
 WKBB in Mantee, Mississippi
  in Albany, New York
  in New London, Connecticut
  in Princeton, West Virginia
  in North Syracuse, New York
  in Lebanon, Kentucky
  in Pinconning, Michigan
  in Lyons, Georgia
  in Clyde, Ohio
 WMXE in South Charleston, West Virginia
 WNEX-FM in Perry, Georgia
  in Portland, Indiana
 WPZS in Indian Trail, North Carolina
 WQFL (FM) in Rockford, Illinois
 WQHN in East Jordan, Michigan
  in Allegan, Michigan
 WRCO-FM in Richland Center, Wisconsin
  in Amherst, Massachusetts
  in Fairmont, North Carolina
 WTGT-LP in Donnellson, Illinois
 WVLY-FM in Milton, Pennsylvania
  in Big Rapids, Michigan
  in Berlin, Vermont
 WXIR-LP in Rochester, New York
  in Waverly, Ohio
  in Gainesville, Florida
 WXND-LP in Louisville, Kentucky
 WYNZ in Westbrook, Maine
  in Westover, West Virginia
  in Macon, Illinois

Venezuela
 La Mega in Puerto la cruz, Anz

References 

Lists of radio stations by frequency